Lucien Buysse (11 September 1892 – 3 January 1980) was a Belgian cyclist and a champion of the Tour de France.

Career
Born in Wontergem, Buysse began racing professionally in 1914, when he entered the Tour de France but did not finish. He resumed his career after World War I, entering but abandoning the Tour again in 1919 but placing third in the Paris–Roubaix classic in 1920. In 1923 he completed the Tour de France and finished in eighth place. In the 1924 and 1925 Tours, he rode with the Italian Automoto team led by Ottavio Bottecchia, where he was perhaps the first domestique in the history of the Tour. He placed third in 1924 and second in 1925.

The 1926 Tour was the longest in its history (5,745 km), with 17 stages averaging 338 km. Buysse, racing with his two brothers Jules and Michel, took the yellow jersey from Gustave Van Slembrouck on stage 10 by attacking during a furious storm on the Col d'Aspin in the Pyrenees. He gained almost an hour during the stage over his team leader Bottecchia who then abandoned. Buysse arrived in Paris as the champion despite suffering the loss of his daughter during the race. 

In 1926, Buysse forced the Tour de France organiser Henri Desgrange to create a new rule when he eliminated the entire field by finishing so far ahead that everyone else was outside the limit. Desgrange extended the day's limit to 40 per cent of the winner's time and ruled that nobody in the first 10 could be eliminated.

Buysse won a total of five stages of the Tour during his career: one in 1923; two in 1925 and two in 1926.

Career achievements

Major results

1913
Tour of Belgium for amateurs
1914
Brussels-Liège for amateurs
1922
Lier
1923
Six Days of Ghent (with Victor Standaert)
Tour de France:
8th place overall classification
Winner stage 8
1924
Tour de France:
3rd place overall classification
1925
Tour de France:
2nd place overall classification
Winner stages 11 and 12
1926
Tour de France:
 Winner overall classification
Winner stages 10 and 11
1927
Stadsprijs Geraardsbergen

Grand Tour results timeline

External links 

Official Tour de France results for Lucien Buysse

Belgian male cyclists
Tour de France winners
Belgian Tour de France stage winners
1892 births
1980 deaths
People from Deinze
Cyclists from East Flanders
20th-century Belgian people